Irina Kazantseva is a Russian Paralympic powerlifter. She represented Russia at the 2008 Summer Paralympics and at the 2012 Summer Paralympics and she won the silver medal in the women's 56 kg event in 2008.

At the 2019 World Para Powerlifting Championships held in Nur-Sultan, Kazakhstan, she competed in the women's 61 kg event without winning a medal.

References

External links 
 

Living people
Year of birth missing (living people)
Place of birth missing (living people)
Powerlifters at the 2008 Summer Paralympics
Powerlifters at the 2012 Summer Paralympics
Medalists at the 2008 Summer Paralympics
Paralympic silver medalists for Russia
Paralympic medalists in powerlifting
Paralympic powerlifters of Russia
20th-century Russian women
21st-century Russian women